Aurelia Frances Plath (née Schober; April 26, 1906 – March 11, 1994) was the wife of Otto Emil Plath, the mother of the American poet Sylvia Plath, and her brother Warren, and the grandmother of Frieda Rebecca Hughes and Nicholas Farrar Hughes.

Aurelia Plath was born in Boston, Massachusetts, the daughter of Franz (Frank) Schober of Bad Aussee, Styria, and his wife Aurelia Grünwald (Greenwood). She grew up in Jamaica Plain and Winthrop, Massachusetts.

In 1928, Schober graduated with a Bachelor of Secretarial Sciences (B.S.S.) degree from Boston University's College of Practical Arts and Letters, opened in 1919 to prepare women for secretarial careers. Aurelia Schober was president of the college's German Club, vice-president of its Writers' Club, editor-in-chief of the college yearbook, and class valedictorian. Schober received a Master of Arts degree in English and German from Boston University in 1930. Her thesis topic was "The Paracelsus of History and Literature". She married Otto Plath in 1932 and subsequently gave birth to daughter Sylvia in the same year and son Warren in 1935. Otto Plath died in 1940. To support her children, in 1942 Mrs. Plath took a job as an instructor of medical secretarial skills at Boston University, attaining the rank of associate professor. Mrs. Plath taught there until her forced retirement in 1971.

In 1975, Mrs. Plath published her daughter's letters from 1950 to 1963 as Letters Home. Playwright Rose Leiman Goldemberg in 1979 successfully adapted Mrs. Plath's book for the stage, and the play's Paris production formed the basis for the French-language movie Letters Home (1986), directed by Chantal Akerman.

In 1977, Indiana University at Bloomington's Lilly Library acquired for its archives Mrs. Plath's collection of Sylvia's letters, childhood diaries and memorabilia, and early poems and stories. Mrs. Plath donated other papers to Smith College's Plath archive in 1983.

Sylvia Plath made reference to her maternal grandmother by making "Esther Greenwood" the name of the heroine in her 1963 semi-autobiographical novel The Bell Jar. The relationship between Aurelia Plath and her daughter was a rather problematic and ambiguous one, for on the one hand they were exceptionally close to each other, and on the other hand Sylvia Plath often claimed that she hated her mother. Sylvia Plath portrayed their relationship in the poems "The Disquieting Muses" and "Medusa" and in the novel "The Bell Jar." Aurelia Plath called "cruel" the novel's characterizations of herself, family, and friends.

Aurelia Plath died March 11, 1994, aged 87, of complications from Alzheimer's disease in Needham, Massachusetts.

References

1906 births
1994 deaths
Sylvia Plath
Deaths from Alzheimer's disease
People from Needham, Massachusetts
American people of Austrian descent